Ram Naresh Agnihotri is an Indian politician and a member of 18th Uttar Pradesh Assembly   and also  17th Legislative Assembly of Uttar Pradesh of India. He represents the Bhongaon (Assembly constituency) in Mainpuri district of Uttar Pradesh and is a member of the Bharatiya Janata Party.

Early life and education 
Agnihotri was born 27 May 1957 in Mainpuri, Uttar Pradesh to his father Om Prakash Agnihotri. He belongs to Brahman community. In 1986, he married Kalpana Agnihotri, they have two sons and four daughters. In 1978, he had completed Bachelor of Laws education from K.K. Degree College University Lucknow.

Political career
Agnihotri has been MLA for two terms. Since 2017, he represents Bhongaun constituency as a member of Bhartiya Janata Party. In 2017 Uttar Pradesh Legislative Assembly election, he defeated Samajwadi Party candidate Alok Kumar Shakya by a margin of 20,297 votes. He is second candidate for Bhartiya Janta Party who registered win on Bhongaon (Assembly constituency), first was Shivraj Singh Chauhan (P.T.I.). 

He has been appointed Cabinet minister in Yogi Adityanath cabinet on 21 August 2019. He got departments of Excise, Liquor Prohibition, formerly held by Health Minister Jai Pratap Singh.

Posts held

References

Uttar Pradesh MLAs 2017–2022
Bharatiya Janata Party politicians from Uttar Pradesh
Living people
People from Mainpuri district
1957 births
Uttar Pradesh MLAs 2022–2027